Carex aequialta is a tussock-forming perennial in the family Cyperaceae, that is native to southern parts of Mexico.

See also
 List of Carex species

References

arsenei
Plants described in 1910
Taxa named by Georg Kükenthal
Flora of Mexico